Bayana is a historical town and the headquarters of Bayana tehsil in Bharatpur district of Rajasthan in India. Hindaun City is nearest city of Bayana - 33 km. It was the site of famous Important Battle of Bayana in 1527 between the Rajput king Rana Sanga of Mewar and Timurid King Babur of Fergana.

History

Bayana is also known as the 'city of Vansasur'. The Bayana Fort built by Yadava King Vijaypala Of Jadoun Rajput Dynasty.  Bayana was also famous for the Nil ki Mandi in the Mughal period. The Muslim community also lives in good numbers in Bayana, even the elderly people of the Muslim community believe that when the pilgrimage of the Muslims was to be chosen, there was a difference of only two and a half graves in Mecca and Bayana. The place would have been a Muslim pilgrimage in Bayana. The mosque here is also known as Usha Mosque. The Usha Temple at Bhinabari is also a very famous temple from where the blessings of the existence of Bayana are received.

The history of earnest is thousands of years old. It is called the city of Banasura, because the premonition of Usha, the daughter of Banasura and Aniruddha, the great-grandson of Lord Krishna, is described in Srimad Bhagwat 10.62 and Puranas. The Bayana Usha Temple here is a proof of this. In the year 322 Gupta dynasty was ruled by Chandragupta. At that time Pushp Gupta was appointed as its governor in the earnest area known as Sripath. In 371-72, the feudatory warlord Kshatriya of Emperor Samudra Gupta erected the Yajna Pillar. Its remains are still present today. It shows that there was a fort here at that time too. Also in 960, the Pratihara dynasty ruled. Queen Chitralekha of Fakka dynasty King Laxman San built the Usha Temple under the rule of Emperor Mahipal. Maharaja Vijayapala ruled from 999-1043. Apart from this, the Jats of the Sultanate period, the Mughal Empire and Bharatpur ruled. The remains and inscriptions of dozens of buildings exist during this period. Some important places of earnest-

2000 years old is the history of Bayana Fort. It is also known as the city of Banasura.

Bhimalat 
Bhimlat built in 371. Bhimalat, also called Vijay Pillar. Malwa Samvat 428 means AD 371-72 is engraved on this pillar. This stone pillar was built by King Vishnu Vardhan at the conclusion of the Pundarik Yajna. This pillar is a monolithic pillar made of red sandstone. Which is on the platform 13.6 feet long and 9.2 feet wide. The length of the pillar is 26.3 feet. The first 22.7-foot section is octagonal. After that, it gets diluted. It is clear from the metallography on the top of the pillar that there must have been something on its top too. There is also an article here.

Geography

Bayana is located in a small plain, between two hill ranges running more or less parallel to each other near the left bank of the Gambhir river, at a distance of 45 km from Bharatpur. It has an average elevation of 196 metres (643 feet).

Bayana city has a temple called 'Usha Mandir', which further establishes its link with Banasur.

Another interesting aspect of Usha Temple is that temple and mosque are located adjacent to each other and share a common wall.

Bayana junction is a major railway station situated on Delhi Mumbai Railway network. As an junction it serves people to major cities like Delhi Mathura Kota Agra etc.
Daily passenger trains also originate from and terminate to bayana jn.

Bayana has a large industrial area known as riico Bayana, which mainly consist of stone industries.
The city was once known for its magnificent architecture but now has lost its beauty due to the negligence of state govt and local municipality bodies.

References

Cities and towns in Bharatpur district

it:Ba